Collin Alexander McHugh (born June 19, 1987) is an American professional baseball pitcher for the Atlanta Braves of Major League Baseball (MLB). He previously played for the New York Mets, Colorado Rockies, Houston Astros and Tampa Bay Rays.

Amateur career
Born in Naperville, Illinois, McHugh graduated from Providence Christian Academy in Lilburn, Georgia, and attended Berry College. In 2007, he played collegiate summer baseball in the Cape Cod Baseball League for the Chatham A's and the Wareham Gatemen. He was drafted by the New York Mets in the 18th round of the 2008 Major League Baseball Draft.

Professional career

New York Mets

McHugh was called up to the major leagues on August 22, 2012, and he made his MLB debut on August 23 against the Colorado Rockies at Citi Field. He pitched seven scoreless innings and got nine strikeouts while surrendering two hits and a walk. Despite his performance, McHugh did not get the win as the Mets lost, 1–0. McHugh made two more starts before being demoted on August 24 to make room on the roster for Jeremy Hefner. Overall with the 2012 Mets, he appeared in eight games (four starts) compiling an 0–4 record with a 7.59 ERA. During 2013, McHugh made three appearances (one start) with the Mets; he had a 10.29 ERA and an 0–1 record.

Colorado Rockies
The Mets traded McHugh to the Colorado Rockies for outfielder Eric Young Jr. on June 18, 2013. McHugh appeared in four games (all starts) for the 2013 Rockies, registering an 0–3 record with 9.95 ERA. He was designated for assignment on December 16, 2013.

Houston Astros

On December 18, 2013, McHugh was claimed off waivers by the Houston Astros. In 2014, he finished with 11 wins and led the team in ERA, with a 2.73 mark. In 2015, McHugh finished 2nd in the American League in wins with 19, behind teammate Dallas Keuchel's 20 wins. In 2016, he pitched in a career-high 33 starts, finishing 13–10 with an ERA of 4.34 in  innings.

McHugh began the 2017 season on the 10-day disabled list due to tendonitis in his right shoulder. On April 6, 2017, he left a game while on rehab assignment with the Triple-A Fresno Grizzlies after feeling tightness in his elbow and biceps. With posterior impingement in his right elbow, McHugh was ruled out for an extended period of time. He was limited to just 12 starts. He appeared in two games of the postseason, pitching a combined total of six innings, allowing a total of one hit and three runs. The Astros won the 2017 World Series. Three years later, the Houston Astros sign stealing scandal broke, in which it was revealed that the Astros had cheated during their championship season. McHugh said that he knew about the sign stealing scheme and expressed remorse for going along with it.

McHugh made the transition to a relief role in 2018, appearing in 58 games. He finished with an ERA of 1.99 in  innings, striking out 94. In 2018, he had the third-lowest swing rate for his in-strike-zone sliders of any pitcher in baseball (43.9%), behind only Aroldis Chapman (42.5%) and Robert Stock (43.1%).

McHugh began the 2019 season as a starting pitcher for the Astros, a job he secured in spring training. He was demoted to the bullpen on May 11, 2019, after eight starts. At the time of his demotion, he had registered an ERA of 6.37 in 41 innings. Overall with the 2019 Astros, McHugh appeared in 35 games (8 starts) while recording 82 strikeouts in  innings with a 4.70 ERA and a 4–5 record. On October 31, 2019, McHugh elected to become a free agent.

Boston Red Sox
On March 5, 2020, McHugh signed a one-year contract with the Boston Red Sox. On July 19, the team announced that he would not play during the start-delayed 2020 season, noting that McHugh's "elbow was not responding as he had hoped" following a non-surgical procedure during the offseason. He was added to the team's restricted list on July 23. On October 28, McHugh elected free agency.

Tampa Bay Rays
On February 21, 2021, McHugh signed a one-year, $1.8 million contract with the Tampa Bay Rays.

Atlanta Braves
On March 15, 2022, McHugh signed a two-year contract worth $10 million with the Atlanta Braves. The deal includes a $6 million club option for 2024 and a $1 million buyout.

International career
On October 29, 2018, McHugh was selected as a member of the MLB All-Stars for the 2018 MLB Japan All-Star Series.

Personal life
McHugh married longtime girlfriend Ashley Buzzy in 2009 in Athens, Georgia. The couple welcomed their first child, a son named Elder, in December 2015.  In 2019, McHugh started a podcast called "The Twelve Six Podcast" where he interviewed other MLB players to bring out the human side of baseball.

See also

 Houston Astros award winners and league leaders

References

External links

 
 

1987 births
Living people
Atlanta Braves players
Baseball players from Georgia (U.S. state)
Berry College alumni
Binghamton Mets players
Brooklyn Cyclones players
Buffalo Bisons (minor league) players
Chatham Anglers players
Colorado Rockies players
Colorado Springs Sky Sox players
Houston Astros players
Kingsport Mets players
Las Vegas 51s players
Leones del Caracas players
American expatriate baseball players in Venezuela
Major League Baseball pitchers
New York Mets players
Oklahoma City RedHawks players
Peoria Javelinas players
Savannah Sand Gnats players
Sportspeople from Naperville, Illinois
St. Lucie Mets players
Tampa Bay Rays players
Tulsa Drillers players
Wareham Gatemen players